56 Armoured Regiment is an armoured regiment of the Indian Army Armoured Corps.

Formation
The regiment, nicknamed the ‘Lionhearts’, is one of the youngest armoured regiments and was raised on 1 October 2011. Lieutenant General Ajai Singh is the current Colonel of the Regiment.

Gallantry awards
The regiment has won the following gallantry awards - 
COAS Commendation Cards - 1

References

Armoured and cavalry regiments of the Indian Army from 1947
Military units and formations established in 2011